The 1973 Peachtree Corners Classic – Doubles was an event of the 1973 Peachtree Corners Classic men's tennis tournament that was played at the Alexander Memorial Coliseum in Atlanta, Georgia in the United States from March 19 through March 25, 1973. The draw comprised 16 players of which six were seeded. Tom Okker and Marty Riessen were the defending doubles champions, but did not compete in this edition. First-seeded Roy Emerson and Rod Laver won the doubles title, defeating unseeded Robert Maud and Andrew Pattison in the final, 7–6, 6–3.

Seeds

Draw

References

External links
 ITF tournament edition details

Peachtree Corners Classic